Lloyd Alexander McIntyre (May 13, 1908 - November 29, 1984) was a Canadian professional ice hockey player. He played with the Edmonton Eskimos of the Western Canada Hockey League. McIntyre also played with the Hamilton Tigers and Pittsburgh Yellow Jackets of the International Hockey League, and Quebec Castors of the CAHL.

He was the last surviving former player of the Edmonton Eskimos.

References

External links

1908 births
1984 deaths
Edmonton Eskimos (ice hockey) players
Ice hockey people from New Brunswick
People from Miramichi, New Brunswick
Canadian ice hockey left wingers